Campbell County Airport  is a county-owned, public-use airport located  east of the central business district of Jacksboro, a town in Campbell County, Tennessee, United States. This airport is included in the FAA's National Plan of Integrated Airport Systems for 2011–2015, which categorized it as a general aviation facility.

Although most U.S. airports use the same three-letter location identifier for the FAA and IATA, this airport is assigned JAU by the FAA but has no designation from the IATA (which assigned JAU to Jauja, Peru).

Facilities and aircraft 
It has one runway designated 5/23 with an asphalt surface measuring 4,000 by 75 feet (1,219 x 23 m).

For the 12-month period ending June 30, 2009, the airport had 4,720 aircraft operations, an average of 12 per day: 99.6% general aviation and 0.4% military. At that time there were 10 single-engine aircraft based at this airport.

References

External links 
 Campbell County Airport page at Tennessee DOT Airport Directory
 Aerial photo as of 23 February 1997 from USGS The National Map
 
 

Airports in Tennessee
Buildings and structures in Campbell County, Tennessee
Transportation in Campbell County, Tennessee